The Representative of the United States to the European Office of the United Nations is the chief of mission of the United States Mission to the European Office of the United Nations and Other International Organizations at the United Nations Office at Geneva (abbreviated UNEO in the U.S. State Department). The full official title of the position is The Representative of the United States of America to the European Office of the United Nations, with the rank of Ambassador. The office was established in 1958 by 22 U.S.C. § 287 : US Code - Section 287(e): Representation in Organization. The Representative has the rank of Ambassador and reports directly to the United States Ambassador to the United Nations. The office is sometimes referred to as ambassador but the correct title is representative for organizations.

Mark Cassayre, who became deputy chief of mission in August 2018, has been chargé d'affaires ad interim since January 20, 2021. Andrew Bremberg was confirmed by the United States Senate on October 22, 2019 and served until the conclusion of the Trump presidency.

Representatives

References from unless otherwise indicated.
Henry Serrano Villard – Career FSO
Appointed: June 15, 1958
Terminated mission: August 3, 1960
Graham Martin – Career FSO
Appointed: September 18, 1960
Terminated mission: April 15, 1962
Roger Tubby – Political appointee
Appointed: October 18, 1967
Terminated mission: September 24, 1969
Idar D. Rimestad – Career FSO
Appointed: September 26, 1969
Terminated mission: June 16, 1973
Francis L. Dale – Political appointee
Appointed: December 19, 1973
Terminated mission: July 1, 1976
Henry E. Catto, Jr. – Political appointee
Appointed: July 1, 1976
Terminated mission: April 4, 1977
William vanden Heuvel – Political appointee
Appointed: July 1, 1977
Terminated mission: December 5, 1979
Gerald B. Helman – Career FSO
Appointed: December 6, 1979
Terminated mission: October 13, 1981
Geoffrey Swaebe – Political appointee
Appointed: November 8, 1981
Terminated mission: November 17, 1983
Gerald P. Carmen – Political appointee
Appointed: April 12, 1984
Terminated mission: August 31, 1986
Joseph Carlton Petrone – Political appointee
Appointed: March 12, 1987
Terminated mission: July 27, 1989
Morris B. Abram – Political appointee
Appointed: May 12, 1989
Terminated mission: March 19, 1993
Daniel L. Spiegel – Political appointee
Appointed: November 4, 1993
Terminated mission: 1996 or 1997
George Moose – Career FSO
Appointed: November 18, 1997
Terminated mission: May 31, 2001
Kevin Moley – Political appointee
Appointed: October 1, 2001
Terminated mission: April 30, 2006
Warren W. Tichenor – Political appointee
Appointed: May 30, 2006
Terminated mission: January 20, 2009
Betty E. King – Political appointee
Appointed: April 2, 2010
Terminated mission: November 2, 2013
Pamela Hamamoto – Political appointee
Appointed: May 12, 2014
Presentation of credentials: June 26, 2014
Terminated mission: January 20, 2017
Andrew Bremberg – Political appointee
Appointed: October 22, 2019
Presentation of credentials: November 12, 2019
Terminated mission: January 20, 2021
Bathsheba Nell Crocker - Career FSO
Appointed: June 24, 2021
Presentation of credentials: January 18, 2022
Terminated mission: Incumbent

References

External links
United States mission to the U.N. in Geneva

 

United States